The Ford Ranger (T6) is a range of mid-size pickup trucks manufactured and sold by Ford Motor Company since 2011.  Consolidating worldwide production of the Ranger onto a single model range, the model line replaced the 1998–2012 Ranger marketed in North America and South America and the Mazda-derived Ranger sold in Asia-Pacific, Europe and several Latin American markets.

Based on the T6 platform, this series of the Ranger was designed and engineered by Ford of Australia.  Though developed for sales worldwide, the Ranger T6 was initially not marketed for sale in the United States and Canada (with Ford instead concentrating its resources on turbocharged versions of the F-150 at the time).  For 2019, the Ranger T6 was released for sale in North America, slotted between the F-150 and the later Maverick (released in 2022).

In late 2021, the second generation of the Ranger T6 was revealed for 2022 production, adopting a revised T6 platform known as "T6.2" with a modernized body design.



First generation (P375/PX; 2011) 

First unveiled at the Australian International Motor Show in Sydney in October 2010, production of the first-generation T6-based Ranger commenced in mid-2011. During development, the first-generation T6-based Ranger is codenamed P375, and also known by the PX model code in Australia. It is considered the third-generation Ranger in most international markets, and the fourth-generation Ranger in North America.

Similar to its 2006–2011 predecessor, the P375 Ranger is produced in three body styles worldwide. Along with the standard pickup truck, the Ranger is also offered as a chassis cab, effectively taking the place of the Ford Falcon cab-chassis in Australia.

All four-door Rangers have the same ground clearance, whether two-wheel drive or four-wheel drive; two-door versions are offered with a "Hi-Rider" option in two-wheel drive configuration, giving them the same ground clearance as 4x4 versions.

The model is produced across several facilities worldwide. First produced by the AutoAlliance (and also later Ford Thailand Manufacturing) facilities in Rayong, Thailand, production is also conducted in Argentina and South Africa, while CKD assembly are conducted in Nigeria and Vietnam. North American production is sourced from the Michigan Assembly Plant in Wayne, Michigan.

As of 2022, the Argentine version contains 46% locally-made parts. 70% of its production is exported.

The model is also used as the basis for the second-generation Mazda BT-50 and the second-generation Ford Everest. The 2014–2021 Troller T4 off-road vehicle is also derived from the T6 platform shared with the Ranger.

Facelift 
In 2015, the P375 Ranger underwent a major mid-cycle redesign (codenamed PX MkII in Australia), with the front fascia adopting elements of Ford Kinetic Design. In place of the rectangular three-bar grille, the Ranger adopted a slightly oval grille with a single center bar, allowing further differentiation between the Ranger and the mechanically similar Everest, the Interior was also completely overhauled with the rear of the vehicle remaining largely unchanged.

In 2019, the P375 Ranger underwent a second, minor redesign (codenamed PX MkIII in Australia), with its exterior appearance being largely the same as the PXII with a few minor cosmetic changes to the front of the vehicle. Some mechanical changes were made such as a new front end suspension setup and the option to spec the XLT & Wildtrak trims with the 2.0-litre engine from the Ranger Raptor. The interior remained largely unchanged with upgrades to safety features and a new infotainment system based on the Ford SYNC 3 operating system.

First facelift 
Second facelift

Powertrain

Trim levels 
The global Ranger follows traditional Ford truck trim level nomenclature, offering XL, XLS, and XLT trim levels. Based on its four-wheel drive versions, Ford offers the Ranger Sport, Ranger FX4, Ranger Wildtrak and the Ranger Wildtrak X, with model-specific exteriors. The North American version of the Ranger shares similar nomenclature, with XL, XLT, and Lariat; the FX4 is offered as an option package for 4x4 vehicles. The Tremor trim level was introduced in North America in 2020.

Wildtrak 
In certain global markets, including Australia and UK, Ford released the Ranger Wildtrak as a special edition of the Ranger. Based on the four-wheel drive crew-cab, the Wildtrak was equipped with a 3.2-litre Duratorq diesel engine with a manual or automatic transmission. To visually distinguish the model, the Wildtrak was equipped with a model-specific grille (painted dark grey), model-specific 18-inch wheels, and other exterior and interior trim. Marketed in a colour exclusive to the trim (Pride Orange), the Wildtrak was also offered in several other colours.

Pre-facelift

First facelift

Second facelift

Raptor 
Unveiled in Thailand in February 2018, the Ranger Raptor is a high-performance truck optimized for off-road driving similar to the larger F-150 Raptor. Marking the debut of the 210 hp 2.0-litre EcoBlue bi-turbo diesel engine in the Ranger paired to a 10-speed automatic transmission, the Raptor is equipped with standard four-wheel drive and upgraded chassis and suspension. As with the F-150 Raptor, the grille of the Ranger Raptor replaces the Ford blue oval logo with "FORD" in block letters. In October 2018, Ford confirmed that the first-generation Ranger Raptor would not be available in North America, citing that the Ranger Raptor was designed specifically for markets where the F-150 Raptor is not available.

Safety
The first-generation T6-based Ranger is equipped with six airbags (seven in Europe). Along with dual front and side airbags, the Ranger is equipped with curtain airbags; European versions are equipped with a driver-side knee airbag. Along with standard anti-lock brakes, the Ranger is equipped with emergency brake assist. The Latin American Ranger is equipped with rear drum brakes.

Australian-market XLT and WildTrak variants have the optional Tech Pack which includes adaptive cruise control, lane keeping aid, lane departure warning, automatic high beams, front windscreen mounted camera and a radar placed on in the front right side of the grille.

The Ranger in its most basic Latin American configuration with 3 airbags and no ESC received 3 stars for adult occupants and 4 stars for infants from Latin NCAP in 2016 (one level above from 2010-2015).

The Ranger in its most basic Latin American configuration with 3 airbags received 4 stars for adult occupants and 4 stars for infants from Latin NCAP in 2019.

Awards 
In January 2021, the Ford Ranger Double Cab 2.0 EcoBlue 213 Wildtrak auto was named Pick-up of the Year by British magazine What Car?. What Car? awarded the Ranger five stars out of five in its review of the vehicle.

North American version (2019–present) 

For its 2011 launch, the first-generation T6-based Ranger replaced previous generations of the Ranger worldwide, consolidating designs developed by Ford and Mazda. A notable exception included the United States and Canada, as Ford exited the compact truck segment entirely. During the early 2010s, Ford concentrated its light truck design resources in North America on its F-Series trucks, with its redesign for 2015 including an aluminum-intensive body and introducing direct-injection and turbocharged engines in an effort to improve fuel economy.

After an eight-year market hiatus, Ford introduced the fourth-generation Ranger for the United States or Canada for the 2019 model year at the 2018 North American International Auto Show, marking the first Ford entry into the mid-size pickup truck segment.  As the first mid-size Ranger sold in North America, the Ranger underwent several design modifications to accommodate US crash standards along with the increase of its payload, with the introduction of fully-boxed frame rails. All versions of the Ranger sold in the United States and Canada have a  wheelbase, regardless of cab or drivetrain configuration. Production started on 29 October 2018.

The North American-market Ranger is sold in four-door SuperCab and four-door SuperCrew configurations. While externally similar to its global counterpart, the Ranger features a number of exterior design changes. The front fascia was redesigned with a frame-mounted steel bumper. At the minor expense of frontal aerodynamics, the sturdier front bumper was designed to better comply with American crash standards.

To better market the vehicle towards private buyers in North America, the Ranger was given a distinct hood design and grilles related to trim level. Additional trim included color-contrasting fender molding and fender grilles, in line with the F-Series trucks. The "RANGER"-embossed tailgate was modified; in the interest of aerodynamics, a spoiler was added. Unlike the F-Series, usage of aluminum in the body is minor, with only an aluminum hood and tailgate.

While offered in both rear-wheel drive and part-time four-wheel drive, all Rangers in North America are produced using the "HiRider" chassis of the Ranger 4x4. Ford did not introduce the Ranger Raptor and the Ranger Wildtrak in North America. Ford has no current plans to market a two-door Ranger in North America.

To comply with American safety mandates, a rear view safety camera is standard. Several sizes of interior touchscreens are offered, depending on trim packages ordered.  To increase interior storage, waterproof storage compartments were added under the rear seats.

Powertrain 
For the North American market, the Ranger is produced with a single powertrain: a 2.3-liter EcoBoost inline-four paired with 10-speed 10R80 automatic transmission.  For increased fuel economy, the engine includes direct fuel injection, four valves per cylinder, and a twin-scroll turbocharger.

Trim levels 
The fourth-generation Ranger shares the traditional trim levels used by Ford light trucks in North America, with base-trim XL, mid-level XLT, and top-trim Lariat. To supplement each trim level, Chrome, Sport, and FX option packages are offered for all three trim levels.

There are several different appearance packages available for each trim level. The base XL trim offers the STX Appearance Package, while the mid-level XLT and range-topping Lariat trims offer two different appearance packages: either the Sport Appearance Package and the Chrome Appearance Package. An FX-4 Off-Road Package is available on all 4x4-equipped models, adding features such as side pickup box FX-4 Off-Road decals, an off-road suspension package, and on/off-road tires.

An off-road focused trim package called the Tremor was unveiled in September 2020 for the 2021 model year. Reserved for the XLT or Lariat trims with 4x4 and the SuperCrew chassis, the Tremor off-road package offers updated suspension tuned for off-road use with FOX Dampers, a terrain management system with trail control, 17" painted aluminum wheels with 17" off-road all-terrain tires, bash plates with skid plates for the radiator, EPAS, transfer case and fuel tank, tow hooks, updated LED cluster data, custom seats with Tremor logs, 6 upfitter switches mounted top center console and optional side and hood graphics.

Second generation (P703/RA; 2022) 

The second-generation T6-based Ranger (fourth-generation Ranger worldwide and fifth-generation Ranger in North America) debuted in November 2021. Codenamed P703 during development, and also known by the RA model code in Australia and Thailand, it continued to be developed by Ford Australia with heavy inputs from Asian, American, African and European subsidiaries of Ford. It has been produced starting from the second quarter of 2022 in Thailand and South Africa for more than 100 global markets.

Dubbed the "T6.2", the vehicle is not completely reengineered with the use of the same basic body shapes and dimensions, door and glass apertures, most chassis hardpoints, along with many engine and transmission options. However, most parts are not directly interchangeable with the previous Ranger, according to Ian Foston, chief platform engineer for T6.

The P703 Ranger features an upgraded chassis, an added wheelbase and wider tracks of  each, and an all-new suspension which has been placed further outboard. The change allows for more room for spring/damper articulation, which improves ride and handling capabilities regardless of load, and 4x4 off-road capability due to greater wheel travel. The engine bay is also wholly reworked with hydroformed structure to allow for the fitment of the V6 engine, a Power Stroke 3.0-litre turbodiesel unit which is first introduced for the 2018 F-150 but heavily modified for Ranger. The vehicle also introduced a wider bed, allowing for a standard pallet (1.2 m x 0.8 m) to fit.

The model shares its underpinnings with the third-generation Ford Everest and the second-generation Volkswagen Amarok. As part of Ford-VW global alliance cooperation agreement, Volkswagen has been involved with the development of the P703 Ranger since 2017.

Raptor 

The second-generation Ranger Raptor was unveiled in February 2022. It is powered by a EcoBoost 3.0 TT V6 petrol engine from the Bronco Raptor paired with a 10R60 automatic transmission. The 2.0-litre EcoBlue biturbo diesel engine from the previous generation will carry over. Ford CEO Jim Farley confirmed that the second-generation Ranger Raptor will be sold in the United States and Canada starting in 2023.

Derivatives

Ford Everest 

The T6 Ranger is used as the basis for the Ford Everest since its second generation. Unveiled in November 2014, the Everest visibly shared body panels with the T6 Ranger including the front hood, front doors and front fenders. The Everest is developed and adapted by Ford Australia.

Ford Bronco 

The sixth-generation Ford Bronco shares its chassis (in modified form) and 2.3-litre EcoBoost engine with the North American version of the Ranger T6.  A mid-size SUV, the Bronco is offered as a two-door and four-door convertible.

Mazda BT-50 

Developed in tandem with the first-generation T6-based Ranger, the second-generation Mazda BT-50 is mechanically identical to the Ranger, using the 2.2-litre and 3.2-litre Duratorq diesel engines (as the rebranded MZ-CD engines). In the reverse of its predecessors, the second-generation BT-50 was developed by Ford. As the BT-50 was styled using the work of a separate design team, the two vehicles share almost no common body panels, with the exception of the roof stamping and the window glass.

In 2020, Mazda released a third-generation BT-50 derived from the Isuzu D-Max, marking the first time in 50 years that neither Ford nor Mazda have shared a compact pickup body.

Troller T4 

The Troller T4 is an off-road vehicle that was produced in Brazil by Ford subsidiary Troller Veículos Especiais S/A.  Designed with a similar body and chassis layout as the Jeep Wrangler and Land Rover, the T4 was produced from 2004 to 2021.  Following the purchase of Troller by Ford, the T4 underwent a design upgrade in 2014, adopting a shorter-wheelbase version of the Ranger T6 frame.

In 2021, Ford Brasil ended local vehicle production, ultimately closing down operations of its Troller subsidiary.

Sales

References

External links

Ranger (T6)
Cars introduced in 2011
2020s cars
Pickup trucks
Euro NCAP pick-ups
Latin NCAP pick-ups
Rear-wheel-drive vehicles
All-wheel-drive vehicles